Brian McGregor (born July 11, 1957) is a Canadian retired professional ice hockey player. He was selected by the Boston Bruins in the fourth round (70th overall) of the 1977 NHL Entry Draft.

McGregor played major junior hockey with the Saskatoon Blades before beginning his professional career in 1977 with the Rochester Americans of the American Hockey League. He played five seasons in the minor leagues before retiring from professional hockey following the 1981–82 AHL season.

References

External links

1957 births
Living people
Binghamton Dusters players
Binghamton Whalers players
Boston Bruins draft picks
Canadian ice hockey centres
Grand Rapids Owls players
Rochester Americans players
Saskatoon Blades players
Springfield Indians players